Eugene Patrick John McCarthy OBE (20 November 1916 - 8 April 2009), also known professionally for most of his career as John Mac or simply Mac, was a three-times Grammy Award-nominated director and conductor of choral music.

Early life

Born in London to Irish parents, McCarthy was education at the Oratory school in Kensington and then on a scholarship at St. Edmund's school in Ware, Hertfordshire, after which he attended the Royal College of Music. His first recording was in 1927 whilst still a boy, where he performed as a soprano. He later worked at a bank, and in 1940 was married to Margaret Quigley with whom he had twin girls and a son. After serving during the Second World War, he studied privately under Mátyás Seiber, a prominent composer and conductor, and also sang professionally as a tenor around the same time.

McCarthy was involved in sports in his youth, particularly in water polo. He was a reserve member of the British water polo team for the 1948 Olympic games.

Musical career

In 1951 McCarthy together with Denis Stevens founded a choral group known as the Ambrosian Singers to provide choral polyphony for the BBC series, The History of Music, which Stevens produced. By the 1960s the group had grown to include 700 singers from which smaller groups could be selected. He also went on to found The John McCarthy Singers.

From 1961-66 McCarthy was the chorus master of the London Symphony Orchestra. The LSO's chorus of this era has been described as "simply the Ambrosian Singers under another name". In the mid-1960s McCarthy moved into opera music, and worked with artists such as Joan Sutherland, Placido Domingo and Luciano Pavarotti. In 1981 he was made the chorus master of the Royal Opera House. He was also director of music at the Carmelite priory in London. Performances conducted by McCarthy were included in the films Chariots of Fire and Amadeus.

Awards
He conducted the Ambrossian choir in performances that received three Grammy nominations, one in 1968 for a performance of Handel's Messiah, one in 1969 for a performance of Shostakovich's Symphony No. 2 in C Major, and one in 1976 for conducting a rendition of Cherubini's Requiem in D Minor, all in the "Best Classical Choral Performance" category. He received his OBE in 1989 for services to music.

References

British choral conductors
Alumni of the Royal College of Music
Musicians from London
1916 births
2009 deaths